This article contains information about the literary events and publications of 1925.

Events
 February 21 – The first issue of The New Yorker magazine is published by Harold Ross.
 February 28 – The first story under the name B. Traven (identified variously as actor Ret Marut or Otto Feige) is published, in Vorwärts (Berlin).
 April – F. Scott Fitzgerald and Ernest Hemingway meet in the Dingo Bar, rue Delambre, in the Montparnasse quarter of Paris, after the April 10 publication of Fitzgerald's The Great Gatsby and before Hemingway departs on a trip to Spain that he will fictionalize in The Sun Also Rises.
 May 14 – Virginia Woolf's novel Mrs Dalloway is published by the Hogarth Press in Bloomsbury, London. Woolf is beginning work on To the Lighthouse.
 May 20 – C. S. Lewis is elected a fellow of Magdalen College, Oxford, where he tutors in English language and literature until 1954.
 Summer – Samuel Beckett plays in the first of two first-class cricket matches, for Dublin University against Northamptonshire.
 July 22 – The first of Ben Travers' "Aldwych farces", A Cuckoo in the Nest, opens at London's Aldwych Theatre in a production by actor-manager Tom Walls featuring the brothers Ralph Lynn, Gordon James and Hastings Lynn.
 October 1 – J. R. R. Tolkien becomes Rawlinson and Bosworth Professor of Anglo-Saxon at the University of Oxford.
 December 24 – A. A. Milne's Winnie-the-Pooh story "The Wrong Sort of Bees" appears in the London Evening News.
 December 28 – The Russian poet Sergei Yesenin (born 1895) writes a farewell poem, "Goodbye, my friend, goodbye" (До свиданья, друг мой, до свиданья) in his own blood before hanging himself at the Angleterre Hotel, Leningrad.
 December – W. H. Auden and Christopher Isherwood meet for the first time as adults in London.
 unknown dates
 Ernest Blythe, Minister for Finance in the Irish Free State, arranges an annual government subsidy of £850 for the Abbey Theatre in Dublin, making it the first state-supported theatre in the English-speaking world.
 Miss Riboet's Orion theatrical troupe is established in the Dutch East Indies.
 The first complete translation of the 14th-century Romance of the Three Kingdoms (三國演義) from Chinese into English is published by Charles Henry Brewitt-Taylor.
 Leslie Hotson publishes the first account from contemporary records of the murder of the dramatist Christopher Marlowe in 1593, claiming to have found the evidence while researching Chaucer's The Nun's Priest's Tale in the archives of the English Public Records Office in 1923–1924.
 T. S. Eliot leaves Lloyds Bank in London and joins the new publishers Faber and Gwyer, having been recommended to Geoffrey Faber by Charles Whibley.
 The Modern Library is taken over by Bennett Cerf and Donald Klopfer.

New books

Fiction
 Sherwood Anderson – Dark Laughter
 Sergei Auslender – Дни боевые (Dni boevye, Fighting Days)
 Alexander Belyaev – Professor Dowell's Head
 André Billy – L'Ange qui pleure
 James Boyd – Drums
 Lynn Brock – Colonel Gore’s Second Case
 Louis Bromfield – Possession
 D. K. Broster – The Flight of the Heron (first of her Jacobite Trilogy)
 Mihail Bulgakov
 A Young Doctor's Notebook (Записки юного врача; partial publication)
 The Fatal Eggs (Роковые яйца)
 The White Guard (Белая гвардия; partial serialization)
 Mary Butts – Ashe of Rings
 Willa Cather – The Professor's House
 Blaise Cendrars – Sutter's Gold
 André Chamson – Roux le bandit
 Arthur Bowie Chrisman – Shen of the Sea
 Agatha Christie – The Secret of Chimneys
 Ivy Compton-Burnett – Pastors and Masters
 Warwick Deeping – Sorrell and Son
 Maurice Dekobra – La Madone des sleepings (The Madonna of the Sleeping-Cars)
 Brian Oswald Donn-Byrne – Hangman's House
 John Dos Passos – Manhattan Transfer
 Theodore Dreiser – An American Tragedy
 Lion Feuchtwanger – Jud Süß (translated as Jew Süss or Power)
 F. Scott Fitzgerald – The Great Gatsby
Rosita Forbes – If the Gods Laugh
 Ford Madox Ford – No More Parades
 Konstantine Gamsakhurdia – The Smile of Dionysus
 David Garnett – The Sailor's Return
 William Gerhardie – The Polyglots
 André Gide – Les faux-monnayeurs
 Ellen Glasgow – Barren Ground
 Maxim Gorky
 The Artamonov Business (Дело Артамоновых)
 Stories of 1922–1924 (Рассказы 1922—1924 годов)
 Thea von Harbou – Metropolis
 L.P. Hartley – Simonetta Perkins
 Ernest Hemingway – In Our Time (short stories)
 DuBose Heyward – Porgy
Sydney Horler – The Ball of Fortune
 Aldous Huxley – Those Barren Leaves
 Mikheil Javakhishvili – Jaqo's Dispossessed
 Franz Kafka (died 1924) – The Trial (Der Process, written 1914–15)
 Sinclair Lewis – Arrowsmith
 Anita Loos – Gentlemen Prefer Blondes
 Compton Mackenzie – Coral
 W. Somerset Maugham – The Painted Veil
 Thomas Mofolo – Chaka
 Eugenio Montale – Ossi di seppia
 Liam O'Flaherty – The Informer
 E. Phillips Oppenheim – Gabriel Samara, Peacemaker
 Baroness Orczy
 The Miser of Maida Vale
 A Question of Temptation
 William Plomer – Turbott Wolfe
 Marcel Proust – Albertine disparue
 Jean-Joseph Rabearivelo – L'Aube rouge (The Red Dawn)
 Henry Handel Richardson (Et Florence Robertson) – The Way Home (second part of The Fortunes of Richard Mahony)
 William Riley – Peter Pettinger
 Kate Roberts – O gors y bryniau (Welsh short stories)
 Romain Rolland – Le Jeu de l'amour et de la mort (The Game of Love and Death)
 Dorothy Scarborough – The Wind
 Gertrude Stein – The Making of Americans
 James Stevens – Paul Bunyan
 Cecil Street – The Paddington Mystery
 Etsu Inagaki Sugimoto - A Daughter of the Samurai
 Sigrid Undset – The Master of Hestviken, vol. 1: The Axe
 Carl Van Vechten – Firecrackers. A Realistic Novel
 Edgar Wallace
 The Blue Hand
 The Fellowship of the Frog
 The Mind of Mr. J. G. Reeder
 The Strange Countess
 The Three Just Men
 Hugh Walpole – Portrait of a Man with Red Hair
 Hugo Wast – Stone Desert
 H. G. Wells – Christina Alberta's Father
 Edith Wharton – The Mother's Recompense
 William Carlos Williams – In the American Grain
 P. G. Wodehouse – Carry On, Jeeves
 Virginia Woolf – Mrs Dalloway
 Elinor Wylie – The Venetian Glass Nephew
 Francis Brett Young – Sea Horses
 Ernst Zahn – Frau Sixta

Children and young people
 Elinor Brent-Dyer – The School at the Chalet
 A. M. Burrage – Poor Dear Esme
 Hugh Lofting – Doctor Dolittle's Zoo (5th in a series of 13 books)
 Ruth Plumly Thompson – The Lost King of Oz (19th in the Oz series overall and the fifth written by her)
 Else Ury – Nesthäkchen With White Hair (Nesthäkchen im weißen Haar)

Drama
 J. R. Ackerley – The Prisoners of War
 Arnolt Bronnen – The Bird of Youth (Geburt der Jugend)
 Mikhail Bulgakov – Zoyka's Apartment (written)
 Noël Coward – Hay Fever (first performed) and Fallen Angels
 Joseph Jefferson Farjeon – Number 17
 Federico García Lorca – The Billy-Club Puppets (Los títeres de cachiporra)
 Patrick Hastings – The River
 Hugo von Hofmannsthal – The Tower (Der Turm)
 Keble Howard – Lord Babs
 Zora Neale Hurston – Color Struck
 George Kelly – Craig's Wife
 John Howard Lawson – Processional
 Ben Travers – A Cuckoo in the Nest
 John Van Druten – Young Woodley
 Franz Werfel – Juarez und Maximilian
 Stanisław Ignacy Witkiewicz – The Beelzebub Sonata (Sonata Belzebuba)
 Carl Zuckmayer – The Merry Vineyard (Der fröhliche Weinberg)

Poetry

 T. S. Eliot – The Hollow Men
 F. W. Harvey – September and Other Poems

Non-fiction
 Max Aitken – Politicians and the Press
 Alice Bailey – A Treatise on Cosmic Fire
 Edwin Burtt – The Metaphysical Foundations of Modern Physical Science
 G. K. Chesterton – The Everlasting Man
 Maurice Halbwachs – La Mémoire collective (On Collective Memory)
 Adolf Hitler – Mein Kampf
 Walter Lippmann – The Phantom Public
 Dmitry Merezhkovsky
 The Birth of Gods: Tutankhamen in Crete (Rozhdenīe bogov: Tutankamon na Kritie)
 The Mystery of the Three: Egypt and Babylon (Taĭna trekh: Egipet i Vavilon)
 Arthur E. Powell – The Etheric Double and Allied Phenomena
 Franz Roh – Nach Expressionismus – Magischer Realismus: Probleme der neuesten europäischen Malerei (After Expressionism – Magical Realism: Problems of the newest European painting)
 George Saintsbury, ed. – The Receipt Book of Mrs. Anne Blencowe (manuscript 1694)
 Clare Sheridan – Across Europe with Satanella (motorcycle tour)
 J. R. R. Tolkien – "The Devil's Coach Horses"
 Hendrik Willem van Loon – Tolerance
 H. G. Wells – A Year of Prophesying

Anthologies
 Alain Locke (editor) – The New Negro

Births
 January 7 – Gerald Durrell, Indian-born British naturalist and author (died 1995)
 January 8 – James Saunders, English dramatist (died 2004)
 January 9 – Abdelhamid ben Hadouga, Algerian writer (died 1996)
 January 11 – William Styron, American writer (died 2006)
 January 14 – Yukio Mishima (三島 由紀夫, Kimitake Hiraoka), Japanese author and political activist (died 1970)
 January 17 – Robert Cormier, American young-adult novelist (died 2000)
 January 20 – Ernesto Cardenal, Nicaraguan Catholic priest and poet (died 2020)
 January 26 – Miep Diekmann, Dutch writer of children's literature (died 2017)
 February 18 – Jack Gilbert, American poet and educator (died 2012)
 February 20 – Alex La Guma, South African novelist and political activist (died 1985)
 February 22
 Edward Gorey, American illustrator and writer (died 2000)
 Gerald Stern, American poet and academic (died 2022)
 March 14 – John Wain, English novelist and short-story writer (died 1994)
 March 16 – Ismith Khan, Trinidad-born novelist (died 2002)
 March 21 – Peter Brook, English theatre director (died 2022)
 March 25 – Flannery O'Connor, American author (died 1964)
 March 27 – John Bayley, Indian-born English literary critic (died 2015)
 May 25 – Rosario Castellanos, Mexican writer (died 1974)
 June 16 – Jean d'Ormesson, French writer (died 2017)
 July 5 – Jean Raspail, French writer (died 2020)
 July 26 – Ana María Matute, Spanish novelist (died 2014)
 August 1 – Pam Gems, born Iris Pamela Price, English playwright (died 2011)
 August 12 – Donald Justice, American poet and educator (died 2004)
 August 17 – John Hawkes, American novelist (died 1998)
 August 18 – Brian Aldiss, English science fiction author and editor (died 2017)
 August 28 – Arkady Strugatsky, Russian science fiction writer (died 1991)
 September 4 – Forrest Carter, American speechwriter and author (died 1979)
 September 6 – Andrea Camilleri, Italian novelist and playwright (died 2019)
 October 1
 Christine Pullein-Thompson, English children's novelist (died 2005)
 Diana Pullein-Thompson, English children's novelist (died 2015)
 October 3 – Gore Vidal, American writer (died 2012)
 October 8 – Andrei Sinyavsky, Russian writer and dissident (died 1997)
 October 11 – Elmore Leonard, American novelist and screenwriter (died 2013)
 October 25 – Romek Marber, Polish-born book designer (died 2020)
 October 26 – Jan Wolkers, Dutch writer and artist (died 2007)
 December 19 – Tankred Dorst, German dramatist (died 2017)

Deaths
 January 4 – Elisabeth von Heyking, German novelist, travel writer and diarist (born 1861)
 January 27 – Friedrich von Hügel, Austrian theologian (born 1852)
 January 31 – George Washington Cable, American writer (born 1844)
 February 16 – Francisco Díaz-Silveira, Cuban journalist and poet (born 1871)
 March 2 – Luigj Gurakuqi, Albanian writer and politician (born 1879)
 March 26 – Hugo Bettauer, Austrian journalist and writer (born 1872)
 April 7 – Gerhard Gran, Norwegian literary historian, essayist and biographer (born 1856)
 April 8 – Emma Curtis Hopkins, American spiritual writer (born 1849)
 May 2 – Antun Branko Šimić, Croatian poet (born 1898)
 May 12 – Amy Lowell, American poet (born 1874)
 May 14 – H. Rider Haggard, British adventure novelist (b. 1856) 
 June 6 – Pierre Louÿs, French poet (born 1870)
 July 13 – Margaret Dye Ellis, American social reformer, lobbyist, and correspondent (born 1845)
 July 15 – Mary Cholmondeley, English novelist (born 1859)
 July 16 – Pyotr Gnedich, Russian writer (born 1855)
 August 15 – George Barbu Știrbei, Romanian journalist, biographer and patron of the arts (born 1828)
 September 11 – Gustav Kastropp, German poet and librettist (born 1844)
 October 31 – José Ingenieros, Argentine positivist philosopher, essayist and physician (born 1877)
 October 7 – Felix Liebermann, German-Jewish historian (born 1851)
 c. November – Percy Hetherington Fitzgerald, Irish literary biographer, drama critic and sculptor (born 1834)
 December 5 – Władysław Reymont, Polish novelist, Nobel Prize winner (born 1867)
 December 15 – Emma B. Alrich, American journalist, author, and educator (born 1845)
 December 28 – Sergei Yesenin, Russian poet (born 1895)

Awards
 James Tait Black Memorial Prize for fiction: Liam O'Flaherty, The Informer
 James Tait Black Memorial Prize for biography: Geoffrey Scott, The Portrait of Zelide
 Newbery Medal for children's literature: Charles Finger, Tales from Silver Lands
 Nobel Prize for Literature: George Bernard Shaw (awarded in 1926)
 Prix Goncourt: Maurice Genevoix, Raboliot
 Pulitzer Prize for Drama: Sidney Howard, They Knew What They Wanted
 Pulitzer Prize for Poetry: Edwin Arlington Robinson, The Man Who Died Twice
 Pulitzer Prize for the Novel: Edna Ferber, So Big

References

 
Years of the 20th century in literature